Zied Ben Salem (born 21 February 1995 in Tunisia) is a Tunisian football player who plays as a left winger for CS Hammam-Lif.

References

External links

FDB Profile

 
1995 births
CS Hammam-Lif players
Living people
Tunisian footballers
Tunisian Ligue Professionnelle 1 players
Tunisian expatriate footballers
Tunisian expatriate sportspeople in Saudi Arabia
Expatriate footballers in Saudi Arabia